The Super Chief was one of the named passenger trains and the flagship of the Atchison, Topeka and Santa Fe Railway. The streamliner claimed to be "The Train of the Stars" because of the various celebrities it carried between Chicago, Illinois, and Los Angeles, California.

The Super Chief (Nos. 17 and 18) was the first diesel-electric powered cross-country passenger train in America. The train  eclipsed the Chief as Santa Fe's standard bearer. The extra-fare ($10) Super Chief left Dearborn Station in Chicago for its first trip on May 12, 1936. Before starting scheduled service in May 1937, the lightweight version of the Super Chief ran  from Los Angeles over recently upgraded tracks in 36 hours and 49 minutes, averaging  overall and reaching .

With one set of equipment, the train initially operated once a week from both Chicago and Los Angeles. After more cars had been delivered the Super Chief ran twice weekly beginning in 1938 and daily after 1948. Adding to the train's mystique were its gourmet meals and Hollywood clientele.

Competitors to the Super Chief were the City of Los Angeles on the Chicago and North Western Railway and the Union Pacific Railroad, and (to a lesser extent) the Golden State on the Rock Island and Southern Pacific. The Santa Fe Super Chief was one of the last passenger trains in the United States to carry an all-Pullman consist; only the Pennsylvania Railroad's Broadway Limited and the Illinois Central's Panama Limited survived longer. The train maintained its high level of service until the end of Santa Fe passenger operations on May 1, 1971.

When Amtrak took over operation of the nation's passenger service on May 1, 1971, it retained the Super Chief. In 1974 the Santa Fe withdrew permission to use the "Chief" name due to a perceived decline in service, so Amtrak renamed it the Southwest Limited. Following the delivery of new Superliner equipment, the Santa Fe allowed Amtrak to call it the Southwest Chief in 1984.

Route

Santa Fe's marketing advantage for the Super Chief lay in the geography of the route as well as its ownership.  The Santa Fe began as a rail line along the old Santa Fe and Spanish Trails, from the confluence of the Missouri and Kansas rivers (at Atchison and Topeka, Kansas) to the Pecos River and Rio Grande in New Mexico. This initial route was eventually extended to Los Angeles.

The convenience of traveling "Santa Fe All The Way" was superior to anything that the competing jointly operated railroads could provide on their routes to the west coast. A single traffic and operating department ruled all the divisions and districts of the Santa Fe route from Chicago to Los Angeles. Dining cars, the commissary supply chains, the on-board service crews and their management; all worked together from Chicago to Los Angeles.

The Super Chief ran through Kansas City, Missouri; Newton, Kansas; Dodge City, Kansas; La Junta, Colorado; Raton, New Mexico; Las Vegas, New Mexico; Albuquerque, New Mexico; Gallup, New Mexico; Winslow, Arizona; Seligman, Arizona; Needles, California; Barstow, California; San Bernardino, California; and Pasadena, California. During the pre-war years the Super Chief did not allow passengers to board or disembark at any point between Kansas City and Barstow; intermediate stops were operating stops only, to change crews or to service the train. During the war the rules were relaxed to carry passengers to and from Albuquerque and La Junta, but only when unsold space was available at train time. Not until the postwar era could passengers travel to intermediate stations on the Super Chief.

History

The Santa Fe intended the Super Chief to be the latest in a long line of luxury Chicago–Los Angeles trains wedded to the latest in railroad technology. In the 1930s these included air conditioning, lightweight all-metal construction, and diesel locomotion. In August 1935 the General Motors Electro-Motive Corporation (EMC) delivered two blunt-nosed diesel-electric units Nos. 1 and 1A, intended to pull the Super Chief. Aside from an ALCO HH600 switcher at Dearborn Station in Chicago, they were the Santa Fe's first diesel-electrics and the first such trains intended for passenger service. The locomotives made their first test run with a set of Pullman cars and a dynamometer car in September 1935. The first Super Chief operated on May 12, 1936, with the diesels pulling air-conditioned heavyweight Pullman cars. 
They were put into regular service on May 18, 1937.

In 1937, Santa Fe purchased several of Electro-Motive’s new “Streamliner Series” diesel-electric locomotives and placed them in service on the Super Chief line. These locomotives were the first to wear Santa Fe’s red, yellow, and silver “War bonnet” color scheme. EMC’s sleek and efficient streamlined locomotives became the standard on North American railroads.  Hollywood celebrities frequently rode the fashionable Super Chief, making it known as “The Train of The Stars.”

Transcontinental sleeping cars
By January 1954 the Super Chief had inherited from the Santa Fe's Chief the service of running continuous Los Angeles-New York sleepers continuing from Chicago on the New York Central Railroad's 20th Century Limited and on the Pennsylvania Railroad's Broadway Limited. The Baltimore and Ohio Railroad offered a similar service with Los Angeles-Washington, D.C., sleepers on that company's Shenandoah westbound and Capitol Limited eastbound. However, in October 1957 the PRR dropped its Broadway Limited sleeper connection. Upon the April 1958 timetables, the cooperating railroads terminated their transcontinental sleeper operations. Declining ridership and delay from switching sleeping cars between Chicago terminals were factors in the through-car termination.

Timeline 

 May 10, 1937: The last of four "preview" runs of the Super Chief-2, with an improved 3,600 hp (2.7 MW), two-unit, streamlined diesel locomotive set built by Electro Motive Corporation (EMC), concludes as the train pulls into Los Angeles. All heavyweight cars used on the Super Chief are replaced with lightweight stainless steel cars. The public is invited to tour the new train at Santa Fe's La Grande Station on May 11 and 12.
 May 15, 1937: The Super Chief departs Los Angeles at 7:30 p.m. PST. The train reaches Chicago in 36 hours and 49 minutes, setting a record. Both new E1 units suffered mechanical damage during the trip and were taken out of service for repairs.
 May 18, 1937: The lightweight Super Chief starts its first regular run, led by Unit 1A and EMC demonstrator Unit 512 (a.k.a. AT&SF Unit 1C) from Chicago's Dearborn Station. The passenger list includes ventriloquist Edgar Bergen and his "sidekick" Charlie McCarthy. (The first pair of E1s were delivered in June.)
 June 15, 1937: The Super Chief makes its first regular run with EMC E1s 2A and 2B, the first locomotives to wear the famous red, yellow and silver "Warbonnet" scheme.
 January 1938: E1 Units 3 and 3A are placed in service on the Super Chief.
 February 26, 1938: Due to production delays, a "borrowed" six-car Chief consist begins running as the Super Chief to allow twice-weekly trips.
 July 2, 1938: Lightweight cars built by Pullman-Standard replace the Chief cars.
 1941: The Santa Fe takes delivery of its only 2,000 hp (1.5 MW) ALCO DL-107/108 model locomotives, units 50 and 50A.
 July 7, 1942: The Super Chief goes on a wartime schedule of 41 hours, 45 minutes. Consist expands to 12 cars.
 June 2, 1946: The train reverts to its prewar schedule of 39 hours and 45 minutes.
 September 29, 1946: Super Chief begins running every other day, departing Los Angeles and Chicago on even-numbered days. With the El Capitan departing on odd-numbered days (except the 31st), the two trains formed what the Santa Fe billed as "the first and only daily  hour service between Chicago and California."
 February 29, 1948: AT&SF receives its first post-War order from Pullman-Standard and places these into service on the Super Chief.  The railroad now has five Super Chief trainsets, enough to operate daily.
 December 29, 1949: Train No. 17, led by locomotive set #37L/A/B/C, collides with a tanker truck in Azusa, California. All four locomotives, baggage car #3409, and railway post office #88 are damaged by fire.
 1950–1951: The Super Chief is reequipped with new streamlined sleeping cars built by the Budd Company and the American Car and Foundry Company (ACF), and dining cars from Pullman-Standard. Santa Fe also adds the Pullman-built "Pleasure Dome"-Lounge car (one of the most luxurious ever made for any train) to its Super Chief consists, billing it as the "...only dome car between Chicago and Los Angeles." A speedometer in the front of the car showed the train's velocity.
 June 1952: The Super Chief is featured in the Warner Bros. film Three for Bedroom "C" starring Gloria Swanson.
 1954: The General Tire and Rubber Company uses the Super Chief as the centerpiece of a print advertisement for its new "Nygen Cord" tire, in which the train is towed by an AT&SF switcher using one of the tires as a connecting link.
 January 10, 1954: The $15.00 extra-fare is reduced to $7.50; the barbershop and shower-bath are discontinued. The Super Chief started carrying the coast-to-coast Pullmans (which ran through to New York City on the Pennsylvania Railroad's Broadway Limited or the New York Central's 20th Century Limited; east from Washington would run the Shenandoah, westbound to Washington would run the Capitol Limited); the transcon sleepers had formerly been carried by the Chief.
 1956: Round-end observation cars are removed from the Super Chief, converted to blunt-ended cars at Pullman's Calumet, Illinois shops, and returned to train Nos. 17 and 18.  In early 1958 they are permanently removed.
 October 1957: The Pennsylvania Railroad drops its sleeping car connection.
 January 12, 1958: The Super Chief and El Capitan are combined during the off-peak season on a 39-hour schedule.
 April 1958: The continuous Los Angeles-east coast sleeper carriages in cooperation with the New York Central and Baltimore and Ohio are terminated.
 1958: The five Super Chief trainsets are refurbished and redecorated.

On May 1, 1971, Amtrak took over operation of intercity passenger rail service in the United States. Amtrak retained the Super Chief/El Capitan names with Santa Fe's permission. From June 11 to September 10, 1972, Amtrak operated the Chief, a second Chicago–Los Angeles train along the same route. This was the only occasion on which Amtrak ran a second train to duplicate a long-distance service along its entire route outside the New York–Florida corridor. Amtrak dropped the El Capitan designation on April 19, 1973. On March 7, 1974, the Santa Fe directed Amtrak to stop using the Super Chief and Texas Chief names due to a perceived reduction in the quality of service. The trains were renamed Southwest Limited and Lone Star on May 19. On November 30, 1980, Amtrak replaced the ex-Super Chief "Pleasure Dome" and "Hi-Level" cars on the Southwest Limited with new Superliners.

Equipment used

The first motive power set on Super Chief-1 consisted of a pair of blunt-nosed, Diesel-electric units (EMC 1800 hp B-B) designated as Nos. 1 and 1A. Santa Fe employees hung the nicknames "One-Spot Twins" and "Amos 'n' Andy" (from the popular radio show of the day) on the units, which were always paired and ran back-to-back.  In a little over a year the EMC E1, a new 3,600 hp (2.7 MW) streamlined Diesel-electric set (one 1800 hp hood unit and the other a cabless booster unit, also 1800 hp) would be pulling the Super Chief.

A variety of locomotives (including ALCO PAs, EMD E6s, FTs, F3s, F7s, and FP45s, along with Santa Fe's only ALCO DL-107/108s and FM Erie-built units) would make their appearances over the years. All wore the Warbonnet  paint scheme devised by Leland Knickerbocker of the GM "Art and Color Section" that debuted on the Super Chief-2.

Original Consist

The Super Chief-1's mostly-heavyweight original consist included:

 EMC "Boxcab" Diesel Locomotive #1
 EMC "Boxcab" Diesel Locomotive #1A
 Baggage-Club-Lounge #1301 Chief Yellow Bear (also included a barber shop)
 Sleeper (lightweight)Forward (8 sections, 2 compartments, 2 double bedrooms) (see NOTE immediately below)
 Lounge General Hancock  (10 sections)
 Fred Harvey Company Diner #1468 (30 seats)
 Sleeper Glen Frazer (6 compartments, 3 drawing rooms)
 Sleeper Clover Knoll (8 sections, 5 double bedrooms)
 Lounge-Observation Crystal View (3 compartments, 2 drawing rooms)

NOTE: Lightweight sleeper Forward was built in the summer of 1936 as the first Pullman sleeping car using the "alloy-steel truss frame" method.  This car was an addition to the first (heavyweight) Super Chief consist in November 1936 (after early Diesel units 1-A, 1-B and leased 1-C [the "One Spot Twins"] had proved their ability to maintain the schedule). It was built unpainted with fluted sides but was painted dark grey with black and gold striping for use on the Santa Fe. Forward was built in the same period as the articulated set Advance and Progress (constructed in August 1936), which were later used on the early C&NW/UP/SP Chicago-San Francisco "Forty-Niner" which used semi-streamlined heavyweight dining, lounge and sleeping cars with the articulated set on the rear renamed Bear Flag and California Republic.

1st Light-weight Consist

In May 1937 the heavyweight equipment on the Super Chief was replaced with all lightweight stainless steel cars built by the Budd Company; the heavyweight cars were placed back in service with the Chief.  For the new lightweight train, the Super Chief-2, the equipment used was:

 EMC E1A Locomotive #2
 EMC E1B Locomotive #2A
 Railway Post Office-Mail Storage #3400 (transferred to the San Diegan prior to entering revenue service)
 Baggage-Mail #3430
 Sleeper Isleta (8 sections, 2 compartments, 1 drawing room)
 Sleeper Laguna (8 sections, 2 compartments, 1 drawing room)
 Dormitory-Lounge #1370 Acoma (also included a barber shop)
 Fred Harvey Company Diner #1474 Cochiti (36 seats) – now on permanent display at the California State Railroad Museum in Sacramento, California
 Sleeper Oraibi (2 compartments, 2 drawing rooms, 6 double bedrooms)
 Sleeper Taos (2 compartments, 2 drawing rooms, 6 double bedrooms)
 Sleeper-Lounge-Observation Navajo (3 compartments, 2 drawing rooms, 1 double bedroom); now on permanent display at the Colorado Railroad Museum in Golden, Colorado.

The sleeping cars were operated by Pullman but were owned by the Santa Fe. The car names were chosen to commemorate the Native American tribes, pueblos, and cities along the railroad's route.

2nd Consist

On February 26, 1938, the consist was modified:

 EMC E1A Locomotive #2
 EMC E1B Locomotive #2A
 Baggage-Dormitory-Buffet Lounge #1386 San Clemente
 Sleeper Tuba (17 roomettes)
 Sleeper Isleta (8 sections, 2 compartments, 1 drawing room)
 Sleeper Taos (2 compartments, 2 drawing rooms, 6 double bedrooms)
 Dormitory-Lounge #1370 Acoma (also included a barber shop)
 Fred Harvey Company Diner #1474 Cochiti (36 seats)
 Sleeper Oraibi (2 compartments, 2 drawing rooms, 6 double bedrooms)
 Sleeper Laguna (8 sections, 2 compartments, 1 drawing room)
 Sleeper-Lounge-Observation Navajo (3 compartments, 2 drawing rooms, 1 double bedroom)

The railroad added another trainset using sleeping cars borrowed from the Chief to handle the demand for passage aboard the train. Its original consist was:

 EMC E1A Locomotive #3
 EMC E1B Locomotive #3A
 Baggage-Dormitory-Buffet Lounge car #1387 San Acacia
 Sleeper Chinle (17 roomettes)
 Sleeper Wupatki (8 sections, 2 compartments, 2 double bedrooms)
 Sleeper Klethla (4 compartments, 2 drawing rooms, 4 double bedrooms)
 Dormitory-Lounge #1377 Agathla (also included a barber shop)
 Fred Harvey Company Diner #1485 Awatobi (36 seats)
 Sleeper Polacca (4 compartments, 2 drawing rooms, 4 double bedrooms)
 Sleeper Yampai (8 sections, 2 compartments, 2 double bedrooms)
 Sleeper-Lounge-Observation Chaistla (4 drawing rooms, 1 double bedroom)

3rd Consist

On July 2 of that year, the permanent Super Chief-3 consist was established:

 EMC E1A Locomotive #3
 EMC E1B Locomotive #3A
 Baggage-Dormitory-Buffet-Lounge #1387 San Acacia
 Sleeper Chimayo (17 roomettes)
 Sleeper Talwiwi (8 sections, 2 compartments, 2 double bedrooms)
 Sleeper Tchirge (4 compartments, 2 drawing rooms, 4 double bedrooms)
 Dormitory-Lounge #1377 Agathla (also included a barber shop)
 Fred Harvey Company Diner #1485 Awatobi (36 seats)
 Sleeper Tsankawi (4 compartments, 2 drawing rooms, 4 double bedrooms)
 Sleeper Tyuonyi (8 sections, 2 compartments, 2 double bedrooms)
 Sleeper-Lounge-Observation Puye (4 drawing rooms, 1 double bedroom)

4th Consist

Beginning in 1947, a typical Super Chief consist:

 EMD FTA Locomotive #163L
 EMD FTB Locomotive #163A
 EMD FTB Locomotive #163B
 EMD FTA Locomotive #163C
 Baggage-Buffet-Lounge  #1384 San Ignacio (also included a barber shop)
 Sleeper Toroweap (8 sections, 2 compartments, 2 double bedrooms)
 Sleeper Tonto (17 roomettes)
 Sleeper Moencopi (4 compartments, 2 drawing rooms, 4 double bedrooms)
 Sleeper Jadito (4 compartments, 2 drawing rooms, 4 double bedrooms)
 Dormitory-Club-Lounge #1375 Moencopi
 Fred Harvey Company Diner (36 seats) #1484
 Sleeper Kietsiel (4 compartments, 2 drawing rooms, 4 double bedrooms)
 Sleeper Hualapai (4 compartments, 2 drawing rooms, 4 double bedrooms)
 Sleeper Segatoa (8 sections, 2 compartments, 2 double bedrooms)
 Sleeper-Lounge-Observation Coconino (4 drawing rooms, 1 double bedroom)

5th Consist

A typical Super Chief consist from 1948 to 1951:

 EMD F3A Locomotive #17L
 EMD F3B Locomotive #17A
 EMD F3B Locomotive #17B
 EMD F3A Locomotive #17C
 Baggage #3446
 Baggage-Buffet-Lounge #1383 San Simon (also included a barber shop)
 Sleeper Blue Grove (10 roomettes, 2 compartments, 3 double bedrooms)*
 Sleeper Blue Point (10 roomettes, 2 compartments, 3 double bedrooms)*
 Sleeper Regal Town (4 compartments, 2 drawing rooms, 4 double bedrooms)
 Dormitory-Club-Lounge #1392
 Fred Harvey Company Diner (36 seats) #1493
 Sleeper Regal Pass (4 compartments, 2 drawing rooms, 4 double bedrooms)
 Sleeper Regal Center (4 compartments, 2 drawing rooms, 4 double bedrooms)
 Sleeper Blue Springs (10 roomettes, 2 compartments, 3 double bedrooms)*
 Lounge-Observation Vista Canyon (4 drawing rooms, 1 double bedroom)

*NOTE: The nineteen "10-2-3" sleepers in the Blue series had a floor plan unique to the Santa Fe.

In the 1940s and into the 1950s, the Super Chief occasionally interchanged sleepers with other railroads to provide "coast-to-coast" sleeping car service. In those instances, sleepers from eastern connections would take the place of Regal– or Pine–series cars:

 (Pine Leaf, Gem, Creek, Pass, Ring, Beach) — Baltimore and Ohio Railroad "10-6" from Washington, D.C. off the Capitol Limited via Chicago to San Diego (the longest Pullman run in the United States).
 (Pine Arroyo, Brook, Dale, Island, Cove, Fern) — New York Central "10-6" from New York off the 20th Century Limited via Chicago to L.A.
 (Regal Gate, Gulf, Arms, Creek, Town, Court) — New York Central "4-4-2" from New York off the 20th Century Limited via Chicago to L.A.
 (Regal Ruby, River, Spa, City, Inn, Ring) — Pennsylvania Railroad "4-4-2" from New York off the Broadway Limited via Chicago to L.A.

6th Consist

A typical Super Chief consist from 1951 to 1956:

 EMD F7A Locomotive #38L
 EMD F7B Locomotive #38A
 EMD F7B Locomotive #38B
 EMD F7A Locomotive #38C
 Baggage #3415
 Railway Post Office #83
 Baggage-Buffet-Lounge (also included a barber shop) #1385 San Pascal
 Sleeper Palm Top (10 roomettes, 6 double bedrooms)
 Sleeper Pine Arroyo (10 roomettes, 6 double bedrooms)
 Sleeper Regal Corps (4 compartments, 2 drawing rooms, 4 double bedrooms)
 "Turquoise Room"-"Pleasure Dome"-Lounge #502
 Fred Harvey Company Diner (48 seats) #605
 Dormitory-Club-Lounge Car #1343
 Sleeper Regal Hunt (4 compartments, 2 drawing rooms, 4 double bedrooms)
 Sleeper Regal Manor (4 compartments, 2 drawing rooms, 4 double bedrooms)
 Sleeper Palm Lore (10 roomettes, 6 double bedrooms)
 Sleeper-Lounge-Observation Vista Club (4 drawing rooms, 1 double bedroom)

7th Consist

A typical Super Chief consist from the early 1960s (all-Pullman section):

 EMD F7A Locomotive #303L
 EMD F7B Locomotive #303A
 EMD F7B Locomotive #19A
 EMD F7A Locomotive #44L
 Baggage #3544
 Sleeper Palm Summit (10 roomettes, 6 double bedrooms)
 Sleeper Pine Lodge (10 Roomettes, 6 double bedrooms)
 Sleeper Indian Drum (11 double bedrooms)
 Sleeper Regal Isle (4 compartments, 2 drawing rooms, 4 double bedrooms)
 "Turquoise Room"-"Pleasure Dome"-Lounge #501
 Fred Harvey Company Diner (48 seats) #606
 Sleeper Regal Crest (4 compartments, 2 drawing rooms, 4 double bedrooms)
 Sleeper Indian Pony (11 double bedrooms)
 Sleeper Palm Leaf (10 roomettes, 6 double bedrooms)
 Sleeper Pine Range (10 roomettes, 6 double bedrooms)

8th Consist

A typical Super Chief consist from the late 1960s (combined with El Capitan):

 EMD FP45 Locomotive #104
 EMD FP45 Locomotive #101
 Baggage #3671
 Baggage #3553
 Baggage-Dormitory "Transition Car" #3478
 Hi-Level "Chair car" / Coach (68 Seats) #549
 Hi-Level "Chair car" / Coach (72 Seats) #731
 Hi-Level Diner (80 seats) #654
 Hi-Level Lounge (88 seats) #575
 Hi-Level "Chair car" / Coach (72 Seats) #725
 Hi-Level "Chair car" / Coach (68 Seats) #542
 Sleeper Pine Cove (10 roomettes, 6 double bedrooms)
 Sleeper Indian Mesa (11 double bedrooms)
 "Turquoise Room"-"Pleasure Dome"-Lounge #504
 Fred Harvey Company Diner (48 seats) #600
 Sleeper Indian Flute (11 double bedrooms)
 Sleeper Palm Leaf (10 roomettes, 6 double bedrooms)

Station stops
1938
Chicago, Illinois (Dearborn Station)
Kansas City, Missouri
Newton, Kansas (service only)  
Dodge City, Kansas (service only)
La Junta, Colorado (service only)
Raton, New Mexico (service only)
Las Vegas, New Mexico (service only)
Albuquerque, New Mexico (service only)
Gallup, New Mexico (service only)
Winslow, Arizona (service only)
Seligman, Arizona (service only)
Needles, California (service only)
Barstow, California
San Bernardino, California
Pasadena, California
Los Angeles, California
1956
Chicago, Illinois (Dearborn Station)
Joliet, Illinois
Streator, Illinois
Chillicothe, Illinois
Galesburg, Illinois
Fort Madison, Iowa
Shopton, Iowa
Kansas City, Missouri
Newton, Kansas  
Hutchinson, Kansas
Dodge City, Kansas
La Junta, Colorado
Raton, New Mexico
Las Vegas, New Mexico
Lamy, New Mexico
Albuquerque, New Mexico
Gallup, New Mexico
Winslow, Arizona
Flagstaff, Arizona
Seligman, Arizona
Needles, California
Barstow, California
San Bernardino, California
Pomona, California
Pasadena, California
Los Angeles, California

"Hollywood mystique"

The Super Chief was a near-instant success among travelers who appreciated its modern, air-conditioned cars, private bedrooms, high amenity levels, and smooth ride. The train was staffed with top-of-the-line crews ingrained with the best traditions of the railroad, and drew passengers not only from other railroads but from other Santa Fe trains such as the Chief.

The Super Chief quickly became "the" train to ride between Chicago and Los Angeles, much as New York Central's 20th Century Limited was the favored travel option of the time for the East Coast-bound. To acquaint passengers with the various points of interest located along the route, Santa Fe built seven signs marking such notable features as the Continental Divide and Raton Pass.

In the mid-1940s, company president Fred G. Gurley went to great lengths to solicit business from California's motion picture industry. A passenger agent was located in Hollywood specifically for the purpose of maintaining close contact with the movie studios. The train stopped at Pasadena to allow celebrities to board away from the "hustle and bustle" of Los Angeles' Union Passenger Terminal (LAUPT). When the Santa Fe was notified that a particular celebrity was going to be traveling on the Super Chief, a press release was issued to allow the media to interview and photograph the star.

Legendary Jazz Pianist Fats Waller died of pneumonia at the age of 39 on board the Santa Fe Super Chief on December 15, 1943.

In time the passenger list would include many Hollywood stars, such as Richard Burton and Elizabeth Taylor, Humphrey Bogart and Lauren Bacall, Dean Martin and Jerry Lewis, Desi Arnaz and Lucille Ball, James Cagney, Judy Garland, and Bing Crosby. The train's appeal was not limited to those in the entertainment industry, as it also played host to former presidents Harry S. Truman and Dwight D. Eisenhower, and their wives.

Several radio and TV episodes of The Jack Benny Show had plotlines involving the cast travelling on the Super Chief.  in one, a tout at Los Angeles Union Station tried to convince Jack to take the El Capitan instead.

Three for Bedroom "C"
In June 1952, Warner Bros. Pictures released Three for Bedroom "C", a romantic comedy starring Gloria Swanson, James Warren, Fred Clark, Hans Conried, and Steve Brodie. In the film, an aging movie star (Swanson) hides out in a compartment during a cross-country journey from New York to Los Angeles aboard the Super Chief.

Swanson's first color film was one of very few to be shot entirely aboard actual railroad equipment. Santa Fe transported cars from the Super Chief to the production company's studio lot for filming. The film met with lukewarm reviews and was not a financial success, but did showcase the features of the Super Chief.

Dining

Most railroads began offering some form of meal service on their trains as an alternate to the poor fare typically found at trackside establishments even before the completion of the First transcontinental railroad. , save for those of the Santa Fe, who relied on America's first interstate network of restaurants to feed its passengers en route. The "Harvey Houses", located strategically along the line, served top-quality meals to railroad patrons during water stops and other planned layovers and were favored over in-transit facilities for all trains operating west of Kansas City.

The Super Chief included dining cars, staffed by Fred Harvey Company personnel, as part of its standard consist from the outset. In general, the Super Chief operated 36-seat dining cars, although most of them were convertible to 48-seat dining cars with a flip-top (or change of) table and addition of chairs. Dining cars almost always operated with a lounge car coupled to them for bar-lounge service and a waiting area when the dining car was full.  Unlike the Union Pacific "City" trains, the Super Chief and other Santa Fe trains did not use the "twin-unit" dining cars.  Santa Fe, in general, ran somewhat shorter trains that could be serviced with a single dining car (although the heavyweight trains frequently operated in several sections, the streamlined trains generally did not). The height of Super Chief lounge and dining facilities came in 1951 with the new 600-series Dining Cars bracketed by the 500 series Pleasure Domes in front and a bar-lounge-dormitory unit in back (moved from the front of the trains).  The train still operated with the Vista-series 4 Drawing Room, 1 double bedroom observation cars on the rear, albeit without any bar or buffet service.

The bar-lounge cars next to the diner always included dormitory space for the train crew (a staff of 3–4 cooks and 6–7 waiters) required for the two-night-and-one-day trip. The eight Pullmans on the train had a capacity of 150–200 passengers when full but often ran with single-occupancy rooms, making the passenger load less.

When Santa Fe rolled out its new "Pleasure Dome"-Lounge cars in 1951, the railroad introduced the Turquoise Room, promoted as "The only private dining room in the world on rails". The room accommodated 12 guests, and could be reserved anytime for private dinner or cocktail parties. The room was often used by celebrities and dignitaries. As was the case on other railroads, dining car service was a losing proposition financially. Santa Fe, more than any of its competitors, took the concept of using on-board meal service as a loss leader to the highest level to attract and retain customers. The name Super Chief became synonymous with the finest fare available on wheels.

Menu
The Continental cuisine offered aboard the Super Chief went beyond the American fare on other trains, and often rivaled that served in many five-star restaurants. A "Wake-Up Cup" of coffee was brought to one's private bedroom each morning, on request, a service exclusive to the Super Chief. Breakfast and lunch were served à la carte, while dinner could be ordered either à la carte or table d'hôte.

The elaborate dinner offerings generally included caviar and other delicacies, cold salads, grilled and sauteéd fish, sirloin steaks and filet mignon, lamb chops, and the like. For discerning palates, elegant champagne dinners were an option. One of the Super Chief's most popular signature dishes was the AT&SF version of pain perdu, simply and appropriately named "Santa Fe French Toast".

Mimbreño china
The decor, linens, and other dining car accoutrements reflected the same Southwestern flair prevalent throughout the train. Mary Colter, architect, Indian art expert, and 35-year veteran of the Fred Harvey Company, designed the china and silverware used on the Super Chief. Colter, who also designed the interiors of Fred Harvey's opulent La Fonda, La Posada, and El Tovar hotels, based her dinnerware motif on the Native American pictographs of animals and geometric patterns left behind on clay pots by the ancient inhabitants of the Rio Mimbres Valley in southwestern New Mexico around 1100 AD.  Colter drew specific inspiration from the 700 pen-and-ink drawings of Mimbres pottery recorded by archeologist Harriet Cosgrove from 1924 to 1927 while excavating the Swarts Ruin in New Mexico with her husband Cornelius Cosgrove. Publication of the Swarts Ruin record created a sensation in 1932.

The "Mimbreño" pattern was produced between 1936 and 1970 by the Onondaga Pottery Co. of Syracuse, New York, under its better-known trade name, Syracuse China.  The bottoms carried the inscription "Made expressly for Santa Fe Dining Car Service." These distinctive pieces made their debut on the dining car Cochiti in 1937. Used on the Super Chief and other named trains until the end of Santa Fe passenger service in 1971, some original Mimbreño dinnerware can still be found today in service on BNSF Railway business cars.

Mimbreño has been dubbed "the oldest of all railroad china" as its design concept dates back nearly ten centuries. Demand for surviving original pieces has created a collector's market, and led to the issuance of authorized reproductions in recent years.

See also
 Passenger train service on the Atchison, Topeka and Santa Fe Railway

Footnotes

References
 
 Brown, James A. et al. (2004). "The Santa Fe at War." The Warbonnet 10 (4) 5-23.

External links

 "Who Killed the Super Chief?" | by Garl Latham (1999)
 Atchison, Topeka and Santa Fe Railway No. 1344 — photographs and short history of a Super Chief Dormitory-Lounge Car built in 1950.

Passenger trains of the Atchison, Topeka and Santa Fe Railway
Former Amtrak routes
Named passenger trains of the United States
North American streamliner trains
Railway services introduced in 1936
Night trains of the United States
Railway services discontinued in 1974
Passenger rail transportation in Illinois
Passenger rail transportation in Missouri
Passenger rail transportation in Kansas
Passenger rail transportation in Colorado
Passenger rail transportation in New Mexico
Passenger rail transportation in Arizona
Passenger rail transportation in California
Former long distance Amtrak routes